Jacana railway station is located on the Craigieburn line in Victoria, Australia. It serves the northern Melbourne suburb of Glenroy, and opened on 15 February 1959.

The North East standard gauge line is located to the west of the station, crossing the broad gauge suburban lines via a flyover at the Craigieburn (down) end of the station. The Albion-Jacana freight line joins the main suburban line after the flyover, and the Western Ring Road passes under the station via a short tunnel.

History

Jacana station opened on 15 February 1959, a number of years before the Housing Commission started construction of its nearby Jacana estate. The station, like the suburb itself, appears to get its name from a nearby street in neighbouring Broadmeadows.

The railway past the site of Jacana originally opened in 1872, as part of the North East line to School House Lane. In July 1958, construction of the station began, with the slewing of the down line occurring on 13 September of that year to make room for the island platform, as well as the flyover for the standard gauge line, which was under construction at the same time.

On 17 December 1972, the station was damaged by fire. Three days later, on 20 December, 10 wagons on a Sydney bound freight train on the standard gauge line derailed immediately west of the station. The pedestrian overpass at the station was damaged during the derailment, but was repaired by 24 December. Much of the debris resulting from the derailment was also cleared by that date.

In 1975, the current overpass on Pascoe Vale Road, to the west of the station, was provided, replacing an earlier overpass.

On 14 November 1996, two Comeng train sets collided between Broadmeadows and Jacana, injuring 13 people. It occurred after a city-bound train collided with a stationary Broadmeadows bound train. Two carriages derailed in the collision.

Platforms and services
Jacana has one island platform with two faces. It is served by Craigieburn line trains.

Platform 1:
  all stations services to Flinders Street

Platform 2:
  all stations services to Craigieburn

References

External links
 Melway map at street-directory.com.au

Railway stations in Melbourne
Railway stations in Australia opened in 1959
Railway stations in the City of Merri-bek